Iowa Highway 187 (Iowa 187) is a highway in northeastern Iowa.  It begins at U.S. Highway 20 (US 20) southwest of Masonville and ends at Iowa 150 south of Fayette.

Route description
Iowa Highway 187 begins at an intersection with US 20 southwest of Masonville.  It heads in a northward alignment from this point, passing through Lamont.  North of Lamont, it intersects with Iowa 3 before turning to the northwest.  The highway passes through Arlington before turning directly to the west.  Further west, it will turn to the north where it will terminate at an intersection with Iowa 150 south of Fayette.

History
Iowa 187 was formed in January 1931. It headed north along a section line to Lamont. Just north of Lamont, the highway curved to the east and crossed into Delaware County. Shortly thereafter, the highway ended at the western gate of Backbone State Park. The roadway maintained this configuration until July 1, 1980, when the east–west portion was turned over to the counties and Iowa 187 was rerouted north to the intersection between Iowa 3 and Iowa 154. For a short time, both Iowa 187 and Iowa 154 ended at opposite sides of the same intersection, but Iowa 187 subsumed all of Iowa 154 by 1983.

Major intersections

References

External links

End of Iowa 187 at Iowa Highway Ends

187